Peristylus biermannianus is a species of flowering plant in the family Orchidaceae, native to Nepal and the eastern Himalayas.

Taxonomy
The species was first described in 1895 as Habenaria biermanniana. It was later transferred to Platanthera. A molecular phylogenetic study in 2014 found that Platanthera biermanniana was deeply embedded inside a clade otherwise consisting of species of Peristylus. It was transferred to Peristylus, becoming Peristylus biermannianus.

References

biermannianus
Flora of Nepal
Flora of East Himalaya
Plants described in 1895